Obizzo II d'Este (c. 1247 – 13 February 1293) was Marquis of Ferrara and Ancona.

Biography
He was a bastard, the illegitimate son of Rinaldo I d'Este – the only son and heir of the Margrave Azzo VII d'Este – and a Neapolitan laundress. Soon after his birth, Obizzo was expelled from Ferrara with his mother and settled in Ravenna.

For his birth, Obizzo was destined to an obscure future; nevertheless. This situation changed in 1251 when his father Rinaldo, a hostage of emperor Frederick II since 1238, was poisoned with his barren wife, Adelaide da Romano. Without any other sons to continue his line, the Margrave Azzo VII saw in Obizzo the only chance of survival of the House of Este and fought for his recognition as his heir. Obizzo was legitimated by the Pope Innocent IV in 1252, shortly after his mother was drowned in the Adriatic.

In 1264 he was proclaimed lifelong ruler of Ferrara, Lord of Modena in 1288 and of Reggio in 1289. His rule marked the end of the communal period in Ferrara and the beginning of the Lordship, which lasted until the 17th century.

He was most likely killed by his son Azzo VIII d'Este without having nominated an heir. Azzo claimed the government as the eldest son (primogeniture) but his brothers Aldobrandino and Francesco made a violent dispute for their rights. Finally, they made a divisionary treaty over the lands: Azzo retained Ferrara, Aldobrandino received Modena and Francesco obtained Reggio Emilia.

Obizzo d'Este is cited in Dante's Inferno and is in the first compartment of the Seventh Circle of Hell for purchasing Ghisola from her brother Venedico Cacciamenico for sexual relations.

Marriages and issue
In 1263 Obizzo married firstly with Giacomina (died December 1287), daughter of Niccolò Fieschi di Lavagna and niece of Pope Innocent IV. They had five children:
Azzo VIII (after 1263 – 31 January 1308).
Beatrice (died 15 September 1334), married firstly with Ugolino Visconti, Giudice of Gallura and secondly on 24 June 1300 to Galeazzo I Visconti, Lord of Milan.
Maddalena, married firstly with Aldobrandino Turchi, from Ferrara, and secondly with Raniero di Canossa.
Aldobrandino II (died 1326).
Francesco.

In 1289 Obizzo married secondly with Costanza (died 1306), daughter of Alberto I della Scala, Lord of Verona. This union was childless.

References

1247 births
1293 deaths
Obizzo 2
Assassinated Italian people
13th-century Italian nobility
People from Ravenna